Batcat is the ninth EP by Scottish post-rock band Mogwai. It was released on 8 September 2008 through Wall of Sound, three weeks prior to Mogwai's sixth studio album, The Hawk Is Howling, which also features the track "Batcat" (this EP version differs slightly, most notably the introduction of the drums). Mogwai worked in coordination with psychedelic singer Roky Erickson on the song "Devil Rides", which was the only song on the Batcat EP to include vocals.

Track listing

References

2008 EPs
Mogwai EPs
Wall of Sound (record label) albums